Tuesday's Guest (French: L'invité du mardi) is a 1950 French drama film directed by Jacques Deval and starring Bernard Blier, Michel Auclair and Madeleine Robinson. It was adapted by Deval from his own play.

The film's sets were designed by the art director Robert Clavel.

Cast
 Bernard Blier as Charles Josse  
 Michel Auclair as Maurice Vineuse  
 Madeleine Robinson as Fernande Josse  
 Nadine Alari as Ginette  
 Lucien Guervil 
 Bernadette Lange 
 Geneviève Morel as La patronne  
 Suzanne Courtal 
 Paul Azaïs
 Jacques Dynam as Jean Gompers 
 Jean Berton as Un agent 
 Christine Covil as Petit rôle  
 Paule Launay 
 Lucienne Legrand as Petit rôle 
 Jean Sylvère as L'employé de la SNCF

References

Bibliography 
 Philippe Durant. Bernard Blier, itinéraire. Favre, 2009.

External links 
 

1950 drama films
French drama films
1950 films
1950s French-language films
Films based on works by Jacques Deval
French films based on plays
Gaumont Film Company films
French black-and-white films
1950s French films